Josef Bössner (c.1934–2005) also known as Bubi Bössner was an international speedway rider from Austria.

Speedway career 
Bössner was a three times champion of Austria after winning the Austrian Individual Speedway Championship in 1962, 1963 and 1973.

After his death in 2005 he had a race named in his memory.

References 

1930s births
2005 deaths
Austrian speedway riders